The Constitution of the Republic of Kazakhstan is the highest law of Kazakhstan, as stated in Article 4. The Constitution was approved by referendum on 30 August 1995. This date has since been adopted as the "Constitution Day of the Republic of Kazakhstan".

Kazakh language is the official language of the state, while Article 7, section 2 states that the "Russian language shall be officially used on equal grounds".

Preamble
The preamble of the constitution emphasizes the importance of "freedom, equality and concord" and Kazakhstan's role in the international community.

"We, the people of Kazakhstan, united by a common historic fate, creating a state on the indigenous Kazakh land, considering ourselves a peace-loving and civil society, dedicated to the ideals of freedom, equality and concord, wishing to take a worthy place in the world community, realizing our high responsibility before the present and future generations, proceeding from our sovereign right, accept this Constitution."

Section 1, General Provisions

Article 1

Article 1 establishes the state as a secular democracy that values individual "life, rights and freedoms." It outlines social and "political stability, economic development," patriotism, and democracy as the principles upon which the Government serves. This is the first article in which the Parliament is mentioned.

Article 2
Article 2 states that Kazakhstan is a unitary state and the government is presidential. The government has jurisdiction over, and is responsible for, all territory in Kazakhstan. Regional, political divisions, including location of the capital, are left open to lower-level legislation. "Republic of Kazakhstan" and "Kazakhstan" are considered one and the same.
The Republic of Kazakhstan shall build its relations with all countries on the principles of international law.

Article 3
The government's power is derived from the people and citizens have the right to vote in referendums and free elections. Article 3 establishes provincial government. Representation of the people is a right reserved to the executive and legislative branches. The government is divided between the executive, legislative, and judicial branches. Each branch is prevented from abusing its power by a system of checks and balances. This is the first article to mention constitutional limits on the executive branch.

Article 4
Laws that are in effect include "provisions of the Constitution, the laws corresponding to it, other regulatory legal acts, international treaty and other commitments of the Republic as well as regulatory resolutions of Constitutional Council and the Supreme Court of the Republic." The Constitution is made the highest law. Ratified international treaties supersede national laws and are enforced, except in cases when upon ratification the Parliament recognizes contradictions between treaties and already enacted laws, in which case the treaty will not go into effect until the contradiction has been dealt with through legislation. The government shall publish all laws.

See also
Government of Kazakhstan
Politics of Kazakhstan
Constitution of Russia
Terrorism and counter-terrorism in Kazakhstan
Constitutional economics
Constitutionalism
 Rule according to higher law

References

External links

 Constitution of the Republic of Kazakhstan

Kazakhstan
Government of Kazakhstan
Law of Kazakhstan